West Side Place is an approved A$1 billion complex of four buildings, when built, will become some of the tallest buildings in Melbourne. The project is located on 250 Spencer Street, Melbourne.

The complex
The tallest of the buildings within the complex, Tower A, will comprise 600 apartments spanning across 81 levels. At a height of 268.7 metres, it will become the fourth-tallest building in Melbourne, and one of the tallest buildings in Australia. In addition to the apartments, a 5-star hotel of 263 rooms and a 500-seat ballroom will occupy the building. Hotel chain The Ritz-Carlton have signed on to manage the hotel, opening in February 2022. It spans floors 61 to 81, with its sky lobby located on floor 79.

The 65-level Tower B will comprise 520 apartments and 260 rooms in a 3-4 star hotel and will reach a height of 211 metres. The third skyscraper will reach , 70 levels, and will comprise 778 apartments.

The A$1 billion project will be Melbourne's biggest inner-city development, encompassing  of floor space. Developed by Far East Consortium, the complex was initially proposed in 2013, and was later approved in mid-2014 by then-Planning Minister, Matthew Guy. It was proposed to be fully completed in 2022. Most of the building's residential apartments have opened . Construction was suspended in February 2022 when contractor Probuild went into administration.

See also
List of tallest buildings in Melbourne

References

External links
 

Skyscrapers in Melbourne
Residential skyscrapers in Australia
Apartment buildings in Melbourne
Proposed skyscrapers in Australia
Skyscraper hotels in Australia
Buildings and structures in Melbourne City Centre